Rawal is a surname of people belonging to Hindu Rajputs, Marathas Bappa Rawal, legendary ruler of Mewar Kingdom, was the first ruler to use it as a royal title. It is also a surname used by Nepalese people belonging to the Chhetri caste.

Notable 
 Bappa Rawal, legendary ruler of Mewar kingdom India
 Bhim Bahadur Rawal, Nepali politician
 Jam Rawal, ruler of Kachchh princely state in India
 Narendra Raval, Kenyan entrepreneur and philanthropist
 Jayakumar Jitendrasinh Rawal, Indian politician
 Jitendra Jatashankar Rawal, Indian astrophysicist
 Kalpana Rawal, Kenyan lawyer and judge
 Lal Bahadur Rawal, Nepali politician
 Nisha Rawal, Indian model-actress
 Paresh Rawal, Indian actor
 Rajendra Rawal, Nepali footballer
 Sanjay Rawal, American documentary film director
 Sashi Rawal, Nepali pop singer
 Vaibhav Rawal, Indian cricketer
 Vipul K Rawal, Indian scriptwriter

References 

Rajputs
Khas surnames
Marathi-language surnames